This is a list of venues used for professional and some amateur baseball in Providence, Rhode Island. The information is a compilation of the information contained in the references listed.

Adelaide Park (I)
Home of: National Association neutral site in 1875, for games involving New Haven, Boston, Hartford and Brooklyn
Location: Broad, Hamilton and Sackett Streets; Adelaide and Elmwood Avenues
Currently: residential

name of ballpark unknown
Home of: Providence - League Alliance (1877)

Messer Park
Home of: Providence Grays National League (1878-1885) / Eastern League (1886 partial)
Location: Messer Street (east, third base and left field), Willow Street (north, home plate); Wood Street (south, center field); Ropes (now Ellery) Street (west, first base and right field). Some sources name Hudson Street as the north boundary; others say High (now Westminster) Street, or "near" High Street. Photographic evidence indicates Willow.
Currently: residential

Adelaide Park (II)
Home of:
Providence Grays - Eastern Association (1891 disbanded during season)
Providence Grays / Clamdiggers - Eastern League (1892-1903)
Location: west of Broad Street, part of the former Park Garden, a large park bounded by what are now Broad, Sumter, Niagara and Sackett Streets. (Overlaps the first Adelaide Park block.)
Currently: residential

Melrose Park
Providence Grays - Eastern League (1904-1911) / International League (1912-1917) Eastern League (1918 - mid-1925 disbanded)
Location: Longfellow Street (north, third base); Melrose Street (east, left field); railroad tracks and Roger Williams Avenue (south, right field); buildings and Elmwood Avenue (west, first base) [per linked map]
Currently: housing and DMV road test area

Weston Field
Home of: Providence Grays - Eastern League (1918-?)
Location: Cranston, Rhode Island - otherwise unknown

Kinsley Park
Home of:
Providence Grays IL (mid-1925 to end of season) moved from and to Newark Bears 
Providence Rubes / Grays - Eastern League (1926 - mid-1930 disbanded
Location: Kinsley Avenue (north, third base); Acorn Street (west, first base) - opposite Nicholson File Company (a tool maker)
Currently: industrial

Cranston Stadium
Home of:
Providence Chiefs / Grays - New England League (1946- mid-1949 - league disbanded)
Rhode Island Gulls - NECBL (1999-2000)
Location: Cranston, Rhode Island - Cranston Stadium complex - Peerless Street (northwest, left and center fields); Crescent Avenue (northeast, center and right fields); Midwood Street (east, right field and first base); football stadium (southwest, home plate and third base). Flint Avenue (south) and Jordan Avenue (southwest) border the football stadium.

See also
Lists of baseball parks

References

External links
1918 map showing Melrose Park
.rootsweb.com/~rigenweb/maps/1918prov/1918Providence15-2a.jpg 1918 map showing Melrose Park, oriented true north

Baseball venues in Rhode Island
Providence, Rhode Island
baseball parks
Baseball